Rilana Erades – Honsbeek (born November 4, 1984) is a Dutch darts player. She used the nicknames The Dutch Dynamite and Pebbles for her matches.

Rilana is still active in darts, but on a slightly lower level, she plays for the regional selection DBBR.

Career

Erades made her World Championship debut in 2008, losing in the quarter finals to Karin Krappen. She had earlier reached the semi finals of the 2007 World Masters, beating Irina Armstrong and Lisa Ashton before losing to Karen Lawman. She qualified for the 2009 BDO World Darts Championship as the stand-by qualifier where she defeated number 3 seed Julie Gore in the quarter finals via a sudden death leg before losing to Francis Hoenselaar in the semis.

World Championship results

BDO

 2008: Quarter Finals (lost to Karin Krappen 0–2)
 2009: Semi Finals (lost to Francis Hoenselaar 0–2)
 2014: 1st Round (lost to Fallon Sherrock 0–2)

References

External links
Profile and stats on Darts Database

1984 births
Living people
Dutch darts players
Sportspeople from Leiden
Female darts players
British Darts Organisation players
21st-century Dutch women